Arturo Bruni (born 13 September 1994), known professionally as Side Baby, is an Italian rapper and former member of Dark Polo Gang.

Biography 
Son of the Italian director and screenwriter Francesco Bruni, he played a role in the 2011 film Easy! and 2017 film Everything You Want, both written and directed by his father. He was a member of the Roman trap group Dark Polo Gang from 2014 to 2018. The decision to leave the group comes in May 2018, when the artist's father announces his son's decision to leave the Dark Polo Gang to pursue a solo career.

The following month he starts publishing content on social media, especially Soundcloud, under the name of Side Baby (or even as Arturo), thus removing the "Dark" prefix. In April 2019, he released his first album for Universal Music, which takes its title from his first name, Arturo. His second studio album, Il ritorno del vero, was released in 2021.

Discography

Solo
Studio albums
Arturo (2019)
Il ritorno del vero (2021)

Singles
"Medicine" (2018)
"Nuvola" feat. DrefGold (2018)
"Non sei capace" (2019)
"Non mi fido" with Psicologi (2020)
"Fontanelle e sampietrini" (2021)
"2016" (2021)

Dark Polo Gang
Full Metal Dark (2015)
Crack musica (2016)
Sick Side (2018)

Filmography
Easy! (2011)
Everything You Want (2017)
Dark Polo Gang - La serie (2018) – docu-series

References

External links 

 Side Baby, on AllMusic, All Media Network.

1994 births
Italian rappers
Living people
People from Rome
21st-century Italian musicians
Male rappers
21st-century Italian male musicians